The Zillah Bell Art Gallery is a contemporary art gallery exhibiting local and national artists. Housed in a Grade II Listed Building in Thirsk, North Yorkshire, England, the gallery opened in 1988.

Exhibitions 
Exhibitions at the Zillah Bell Gallery change monthly with annual Summer and Christmas exhibitions, the latter serving partly as a retrospective of the year and including the work of both established and up and coming Artists.

In 1996 and 2000, the surrealist artist and writer Anthony Earnshaw, exhibited there with Another G&T in 1996 and Flowers 2 in 2000. 

The gallery is named after owner John Bell’s youngest daughter Zillah who, along with her sisters Daisy & Lettice Bell, were responsible for organising the Art of Care auction of postcards held in Edinburgh, 2005.  Artists who exhibited at the Art of Care Auction included Sir Paul McCartney, David Hockney, Tracey Emin and Damien Hirst.

Artist's list 
 Roger Kohn Hung Drawn and Slaughtered, 2003
 Anthony Earnshaw (1996 Another G&T; 2000 Flowers 2).

Gallery

References

External links 
 Norman Ackroyd, Royal Academy
 Zillah Bell Contemporary Art Gallery Home Page
 

Contemporary art galleries in England
Grade II listed buildings in North Yorkshire
Art museums and galleries in North Yorkshire
Art galleries established in 1988
1988 establishments in England